Edward Goldman may refer to:

 Edward Alphonso Goldman (1873–1946), American zoologist
 Edward Goldman (professor), Talmudic scholar
 Eddie Goldman (born 1994), American football player
 Edward Goldman, art critic, contributor to KCRW